Therese "Bunty" Bailey (born 23 May 1964) is an English former model, dancer and actress. Bunty started her career as a dancer in the dance group Hot Gossip in the early 1980s. She became known as the girl in the music videos of a-ha's singles "Take On Me" and "The Sun Always Shines on T.V." made in 1985. She is the former girlfriend of the band's lead vocalist, Morten Harket, whom she met while working on the videos.

She has since appeared in several films, with her most recent role in 2008 as a Gypsy Momma in Defunct. She is currently living in Wraysbury, Berkshire. She has also worked as a children's dance teacher at Wraysbury and Datchet Village Hall. She was listed by Fox News as being one of The Hottest '80s Video Vixens. Bunty has two sons, Jake and Felix Bailey, who were born in 1996 and 1997 respectively. In June 2009, she was one of the first people to take advantage of the UK government car scrappage scheme and was invited to breakfast with the prime minister at the time, Gordon Brown.  

In September 2012, Bailey appeared as the mystery guest on Channel 4's Big Fat Quiz of the '80s, with her appearance in the a-ha videos being the correct answer.

Filmography
 The Kenny Everett Show (early 1980s) with Hot Gossip
 "Talking Loud and Clear", OMD (1984)
 "Take On Me", a-ha (1985) as the Girl
 "The Sun Always Shines on TV", a-ha (1985) as the Girl
 "To Be A Lover", Billy Idol (1986) dancer 
 Spellcaster (1987) as Cassandra Castle
 Dolls (1987) as Isabel Prange
 Rock and the Money-Hungry Party Girls (1988)
 Glitch! (1988) as Bimbo
 a-ha: Headlines and Deadlines – The Hits of a-ha (1991)
 Essential Music Videos: Hits of the 80s (2003)
 Video on Trial: "Episode No.2.6" (2006)
 Defunct (2008) as Gypsy Momma

References

External links
 Bunty Bailey at Crawfords Commercials Agency
 

Living people
1964 births
English film actresses
English female dancers
20th-century English actresses
21st-century English actresses